Bossgiri (English title: Where The Action Ends) is a Bangladeshi romantic action drama film directed by Shamim Ahamed Roni and produced by Topi Khan under the banner of Khan Films. The film stars Shakib Khan and Shabnom Bubly in lead roles. The film was an Eid-ul-Adha release on 12 September 2016 and was Shabnam Bubly's debut film.

Plot 
Bossgiri follows the story of a man who, after trying to earn a decent living, must turn to becoming a don of the city.

Cast
 Shakib Khan as Boss / Aryan Khan Lucky
Shabnom Bubly as Bubly
 Rajatava Dutta as Double DK
 Amit Hasan as DK the Dangerous Killer
 Maznun Mizan as System
 Chikon Ali as Pike
Mizu Ahmed
 Sadek Bachchu
Ratan Khan

Release 
The film released alongside the holiday of Eid al-Adha in Bangladesh on 12 September 2016. In November 2017, it was announced by distributor Jaaz Multimedia that in a film exchange with SVF Entertainment of West Bengal, Bossgiri would be released in India.

Critical reception 
In a review by Zahid Akbar of The Daily Star, Bossgiri  was given 3/5 stars, noted for a strong cast and soundtrack, but with a weak story. The review criticized the lack of originality and direction in terms of the story, while also being critical of the costumes, hairstyles and choreography, however also praised the performances of newcomer Shabnom Bubly and lead actor Shakib Khan, specifically his Dhakaiya accent, and also the soundtrack.

Soundtrack

The soundtrack for Bossgiri featured music from different artists. The songs were composed by Akassh, Shouqat Ali Imon, Imran Mahmudul and Dabbu, while also featuring the vocals of singers Kona, Nancy, S.I. Tutul and Satrujit Dasgupta.

Track listing

Awards

Meril Prothom Alo Awards 

|-
| 2017
| Shabnom Bubly
| Best Newcomer
| 
|-
| 2017
| Imran Mahmudul for Dil Dil Dil
| Best Singer (Male)
| 
|-
| 2017
| Kona for Dil Dil Dil
| Best Singer (Female)
| 
|}

References

External links
 

2016 films
2016 action drama films
Bangladeshi action drama films
Films shot in Bangladesh
Films shot in Dhaka
Bengali-language Bangladeshi films
Bangladeshi gangster films
Films scored by Shawkat Ali Emon
Films scored by Akassh
Films scored by Dabbu
Films scored by Imran Mahmudul
Bangladeshi films about revenge
Films scored by Emon Saha
2010s Bengali-language films
Films directed by Shamim Ahamed Roni